Noguerornis is a genus of enantiornithine bird possibly related to Iberomesornis. It lived during the Early Cretaceous (early Barremian age) about 130 mya and is known from fossils found in the La Pedrera de Rúbies Formation at El Montsec, Spain.

References

Bird genera
Cretaceous birds of Europe
Euenantiornitheans
Fossils of Spain
Fossil taxa described in 1989